YSB or YSb may refer to:

 YSB (magazine)
 Yonsei School of Business
 Sudbury Airport
 Yacht Safety Bureau
 Yokohama Specie Bank
 Yttrium(III) antimonide